The Boosh (released on CD as The Mighty Boosh) is a 2001 radio series, written and performed by The Mighty Boosh (Julian Barratt, Noel Fielding, and Rich Fulcher), and originally broadcast on BBC London Live, then BBC Radio 4, and later BBC 7.

Overview
The Boosh were signed by the BBC soon after the success of Autoboosh and in October 2001 The Boosh, produced by Danny Wallace, was first broadcast on BBC London Live, then BBC Radio 4, and later BBC 7. This six-part series won the Douglas Adams Award for innovative comedy writing. The set is available from the BBC on audio CD, titled The Mighty Boosh. According to the interview track included in the set, Julian Barratt did the primary editing for the radio show.  The plots to all the episodes were reworked extensively and reused in the first TV series.

The Mighty Boosh returned to radio on 22 October 2004, when they did a comedy special for The Breezeblock, a show on BBC Radio 1. Instead of the plot driven nature of the series, this show featured improvised conversational comedy with Barratt, Fielding and Fulcher, combined with the show's usual mix of electronic music.

List of episodes

On 8 November 2004, a 3 disc set was released by BBC Audiobooks containing all 6 episodes from the series, plus extra material.

In April 2020 the full first series was made available on the BBC Sounds audio player.

Notes

External links

 

The Mighty Boosh
BBC Radio comedy programmes
Audiobooks by title or series
2001 radio programme debuts